Calochilus robertsonii, commonly known as the purple beard orchid or purplish beard orchid, is a species of orchid native to Australia and New Zealand. It has a single dark green leaf and up to nine green to brown flowers with reddish or purplish stripes. The labellum has a glossy purple, mauve, or bronze-coloured beard with a ridge between the "eye" spots.

Description
Unlike some others in the genus, the leaf is fully developed at flowering time. The column has two purple sham "eyes" joined by a distinct ridge. Flowering occurs from August to early December.

Taxonomy and naming
Calochilus robertsonii was first formally described in 1873 by George Bentham and the description was published in Volume 6 of Flora Australiensis. The specific epithet (robertsonii) honours John George Robertson (1803–1862) who collected the type specimen.

Distribution and habitat
The purplish beard orchid is widespread and common in eastern Australia where it grows in a range of habitats from heath to forest and scrubland and from coast to mountains. It is found in Queensland south from Gympie, from coastal districts and inland as far as Condobolin in New South Wales, throughout most of Victoria and in South Australia, the Australian Capital Territory, and Tasmania. In New Zealand, C. robertsonii only occurs on the North Island although a single specimen was collected on the northern tip of the South Island in 1965.

References

robertsonii
Orchids of Australia
Orchids of New Zealand
Plants described in 1873
Orchids of Victoria (Australia)
Orchids of New South Wales
Orchids of Queensland
Taxa named by George Bentham